Air Zambezi was an airline based in Zimbabwe, which was active between 1998 and 2002. The airline's main base was in Harare and its CEO was Oliver Chidawu.

Destinations 
Historically, the Air Zambezi destinations included:
 Harare
 Hwange
 Kariba
 Victoria Falls

Fleet 
Historically, the Air Zambezi fleet included:
 1 Cessna 208 Caravan
 1 Let L-410 Turbolet

References

Defunct airlines of Zimbabwe
Airlines established in 1998
Airlines disestablished in 2002
1998 establishments in Zimbabwe
2000s disestablishments in Zimbabwe